The Fore River Apprentice School was a trade school operated by the owners of the Fore River Shipyard that specialized in the training of personnel in shipbuilding. It was operational from 1916 to around 1984, and trained at least 2,500 men in the trade of shipbuilding.

References

External links
Information on the school's building
Information on the school's football team

Fore River Shipyard
Schools in Norfolk County, Massachusetts
Defunct schools in Massachusetts
Education in Quincy, Massachusetts
Educational institutions established in 1916
1916 establishments in Massachusetts